There are many $100 banknotes, bills or coins, including:

 Australian one-hundred-dollar note
 Canadian one-hundred-dollar note
 Nicaraguan one-hundred-cordoba note
 United States one-hundred-dollar bill
 One of the banknotes of the Hong Kong dollar
 One of the banknotes of the New Zealand dollar
 One of the Fifth series of the New Taiwan Dollar banknote
 One of the banknotes of Zimbabwe

Other currencies that issue $100 banknotes, bills or coins are:

Other meanings
 One Hundred Dollars, a Canadian alternative folk country band.